Galway County Council is the authority responsible for local government in County Galway, Ireland. As a county council, it is governed by the Local Government Act 2001. The council is responsible for housing and community, roads and transportation, urban planning and development, amenity and culture, and environment. The council has 39 elected members. Elections are held every five years and are by single transferable vote. The head of the council has the title of Cathaoirleach (Chairperson). The county administration is headed by a Chief Executive, Jim Cullen. The county seat is at Áras an Chontae (County Hall) in Galway city.

History
Galway County Council dates from 1899, created by the Local Government (Ireland) Act 1898, which introduced county councils to Ireland. It took over the local administration until then carried out by county grand juries and county at large presentment sessions, which included the maintenance of highways and bridges, the upkeep of lunatic asylums, and the appointment of coroners. The new council also took over some duties from the poor law boards of guardians in relation to diseases of cattle and from the justices of the peace to regulate explosives.

The County Council initially met in Tuam. It subsequently acquired the old Galway Infirmary and converted it into a new county headquarters. A modern facility, known as County Hall, was built on the same site and completed in 1999.

Local Electoral Areas and Municipal Districts
Galway County Council is divided into the following municipal districts and local electoral areas, defined by electoral divisions.

Councillors
The following were elected at the 2019 Galway County Council election, under the boundaries which existed at the time.

2019 seats summary

Councillors by electoral area
This list reflects the order in which councillors were elected on 24 May 2019.

Notes

Co-options

Changes in affiliation

References

External links

Politics of County Galway
County councils in the Republic of Ireland